Christmas...Our Gifts To You is a Christmas album by The Winans, released in 2000 and featuring many members of the Winans family.

Track listing
"Hark! the Herald Angels Sing" by Marvin Winans [5:33]
"Have Yourself a Merry Little Christmas" by Angie Winans [4:08]
"O Come All Ye Faithful" by CeCe Winans [4:37]
"Silent Night" by Ann McCrary [3:01]
"Go Tell It on the Mountain" by Pop Winans [4:46]
"Angels We Have Heard on High" by Kirk & Kevin Whalum [5:40]
"The True Meaning of Christmas" by Reverend Virgil Caldwell [5:06]
"What Child Is This?" by Mom Winans [5:19]
"Little Drummer Boy" by Darwin Hobbs [6:42]
"Mary Had a Little Lamb" by Sharon Moore-Caldwell M.D. [4:01]
"A Christmas Moment With Pop Winans" by Pop Winans [1:07]
"Sweet Little Jesus Boy" by Ronald Winans & Adrian Smith [4:44]
"Ryan's Song" by Angie Winans [4:22]

Album credits
Ann McCrary - Performer 
Nashville String Machine - Strings 
Shandra Penix - Vocals (Background) 
Kirk Whalum - Arranger, Instrumentation, Saxophone 
 Marty Williams - Mastering 
 Angie Winans - Performer 
 Marvin Winans - Arranger, Vocal Arrangement 
 Vic C. - Arranger, Mixing, Instrumentation, Engineer 
 CeCe Winans - Arranger 
 Ced C - Arranger, Instrumentation, Mixing, Engineer 
 Mom Winans - Performer 
 Pop Winans - Performer 
 Kevin Whalum - Performer 
 Darwin Hobbs - Vocals (Background), Vocal Arrangement 
 LeAnne Palmore - Vocals (Background) 
 Erick Anderson - Design, Photography 
 Jarad Woods - Vocals (Background) 
 Jovaun Woods - Vocals (Background) 
 Charzet D. Wright - Project Coordinator 
 Weldon John Wright - Vocals 
 Whitney Loy Wright - Vocals 
 Winston James Wright - Vocals 
 Carlous Drake - Vocals (Background) 
 Ron Winans - Arranger 
 Ronn Huff - String Arrangements, String Conductor 
 James Blair - Drums 
 Victor Caldwell - Producer 
 Mike Haynes - Mastering 
 Paul Jackson, Jr. - Guitar 
 The Winans - Main Performer

The Winans albums
2000 Christmas albums
Gospel Christmas albums
Christmas albums by American artists